Lepidoblepharis miyatai is a species of gecko, a lizard in the family Sphaerodactylidae. The species is endemic to Colombia.

Etymology
The specific name, miyatai, is in honor of American herpetologist Kenneth Ichiro Miyata (1951–1983).

Geographic range
L. miyatai is found in Magdalena Department, Colombia.

Description
Lepidoblepharis miyatai sp. nov. is a unique sphaerodactyline gecko which occurs in dry coastal thorn forest of the Department of Magdalena, northern Colombia. (Lamar, W. W. (1985). A New Lepidoblepharis (Sauria: Gekkonidae) from the North Coast of Colombia. Herpetologica, 41(2), 128–132.
The reason why there's not much information on this organism is because it just disappeared for a while and then came back in whole different new area and disappeared again leavening people to think its already extinct.

Reproduction
L. miyatai is oviparous.

References

Further reading
Lamar, William W. (1985). "A New Lepidoblepharis (Sauria: Gekkonidae) from the North Coast of Colombia". Herpetologica 41 (2): 128–132. (Lepidoblepharis miyatai, new species).
Montes-Correa, Andrés Camilo; Jiménez-Bolaño, Juan David; Medina-Rangel, Guido Fabián; Rivas, Gilson A.; Granda-Rodríguez, Hernán D.; Saboyá-Acosta, Liliana P; Renjifo, Juan Manuel (2018). "Geographic distribution and habitat use of Lepidoblepharis miyatai (Squamata: Sphaerodactylidae), with comments on the taxonomic status of the genus in northern Colombia". Phyllomedusa 17 (1): 61–72.

Lepidoblepharis
Reptiles described in 1985